The 1934 Idaho Vandals football team represented the University of Idaho in the 1934 college football season. The Vandals were led by sixth-year head coach Leo Calland, and were members of the Pacific Coast Conference. Home games were played on campus in Moscow at MacLean Field, with none in Boise this year.

Idaho compiled a  overall record and lost all but one of its five games in the PCC.

In the Battle of the Palouse with neighbor Washington State, the Vandals suffered a seventh straight loss, falling  in Pullman on  Idaho's most recent win in the series was nine years earlier in 1925 and the next was twenty years away in 1954.

Calland resigned after the season in mid-December; he compiled a  record in six seasons on the Palouse, but his overmatched Vandals were just  in conference play, defeating only  He returned to southern California and coached at San Diego State College; his successor at Idaho was Ted Bank, the backs coach at Tulane of New Orleans,  in 1934 and Sugar Bowl

Schedule

 The Little Brown Stein trophy for the Montana game debuted four years later in 1938
 One game was played on Thursday (at Creighton in Omaha on Thanksgiving)

All-conference
No Vandals were named to the All-Coast team; honorable mention were end Norman Iverson and tackle Bob McCue.

References

External links
Gem of the Mountains: 1935 University of Idaho yearbook – 1934 football season
Go Mighty Vandals – 1934 football season
Official game program: Idaho at Washington State –  November 10, 1934
Idaho Argonaut – student newspaper – 1934 editions

Idaho
Idaho Vandals football seasons
Idaho Vandals football